Lynchmere Commons is a   Local Nature Reserve in Lynchmere in West Sussex. It is owned and managed by the Lynchmere Society.

This heathland site is composed of Stanley, Lynchmere and Marley Commons. They have diverse insect species and unusual plants such as bilberries.

References

Local Nature Reserves in West Sussex